The following article presents a summary of the 2022 football (soccer) season in Brazil, which was the 121st season of competitive football in the country.

Campeonato Brasileiro Série A

The 2022 Campeonato Brasileiro Série A started on 9 April 2022 and ended on 13 November 2022.

América Mineiro
Athletico Paranaense
Atlético Goianiense
Atlético Mineiro
Avaí
Botafogo
Ceará
Corinthians
Coritiba
Cuiabá
Flamengo
Fluminense
Fortaleza
Goiás
Internacional
Juventude
Palmeiras
Red Bull Bragantino
Santos
São Paulo

Palmeiras won the league.

Relegation
The four worst placed teams, Juventude, Avaí, Ceará and Atlético Goianiense, were relegated to the following year's second level.

Campeonato Brasileiro Série B

The 2022 Campeonato Brasileiro Série B started on 8 April 2022 and ended on 6 November 2022.

Bahia
Brusque
Chapecoense
CRB
Criciúma
Cruzeiro
CSA
Grêmio
Guarani
Ituano
Londrina
Náutico
Novorizontino
Operário Ferroviário
Ponte Preta
Sampaio Corrêa
Sport
Tombense
Vasco da Gama
Vila Nova

Cruzeiro won the league.

Promotion
The four best placed teams, Cruzeiro, Grêmio, Bahia and Vasco da Gama, were promoted to the following year's first level.

Relegation
The four worst placed teams, Brusque, Náutico, Operário Ferroviário and CSA, were relegated to the following year's third level.

Campeonato Brasileiro Série C

The 2022 Campeonato Brasileiro Série C started on 9 April 2022 and ended on 8 October 2022.

ABC
Altos
Aparecidense
Atlético Cearense
Botafogo (PB)
Botafogo (SP)
Brasil de Pelotas
Campinense
Confiança
Ferroviário
Figueirense
Floresta
Manaus
Mirassol
Paysandu
Remo
São José
Vitória
Volta Redonda
Ypiranga (RS)

The Campeonato Brasileiro Série C final was played between ABC and Mirassol.

Mirassol won the league after beating ABC.

Promotion
The four best placed teams, ABC, Vitória, Mirassol and Botafogo (SP), were promoted to the following year's second level.

Relegation
The four worst placed teams, Campinense, Ferroviário, Atlético Cearense and Brasil de Pelotas, were relegated to the following year's fourth level.

Campeonato Brasileiro Série D

The 2022 Campeonato Brasileiro Série D started on 17 April 2022 and ended on 25 September 2022.

4 de Julho
Ação
Afogados
Aimoré
Amazonas
América de Natal
Anápolis
ASA
Atlético de Alagoinhas
Azuriz
Bahia de Feira
Brasiliense
Caldense
FC Cascavel
Castanhal
Caxias
Ceilândia
CEOV
Cianorte
Costa Rica
Crato
CSE
Ferroviária
Fluminense (PI)
Globo
Grêmio Anápolis
Humaitá
Icasa
Inter de Limeira
Iporá
Jacuipense
Juazeirense
Juventude Samas
Juventus
Lagarto
Marcílio Dias
Moto Club
Náutico (RR)
Nova Iguaçu
Nova Venécia
Oeste
Pacajus
Paraná
Pérolas Negras
Porto Velho
Portuguesa (RJ)
Pouso Alegre
Próspera
Real Noroeste
Retrô
Rio Branco (AC)
Santa Cruz
Santo André
São Bernardo
São Luiz
São Paulo Crystal
São Raimundo (AM)
São Raimundo (RR)
Sergipe
Sousa
Tocantinópolis
Trem
Tuna Luso
URT

The Campeonato Brasileiro Série D final was played between América de Natal and Pouso Alegre.

América de Natal won the league after defeating Pouso Alegre.

Promotion 
The four best placed teams, São Bernardo, Pouso Alegre, Amazonas and América de Natal, were promoted to the following year's third level.

Super cup

Supercopa do Brasil

The 2022 Supercopa do Brasil was played on 20 February 2022 between Atlético Mineiro and Flamengo.

Atlético Mineiro won the super cup after defeating Flamengo.

Domestic cups

Copa do Brasil

The 2022 Copa do Brasil started on 22 February 2022 and ended on 19 October 2022. The Copa do Brasil final was played between Flamengo and Corinthians.

Flamengo won the cup after defeating Corinthians.

Copa do Nordeste

The competition featured 16 clubs from the Northeastern region. It started on 22 January 2022 and ended on 3 April 2022. The Copa do Nordeste final was played between Fortaleza and Sport.

Fortaleza won the cup after defeating Sport.

Copa Verde

The competition featured 17 clubs from the North and Central-West regions, including one team from Espírito Santo. It started on 25 October 2022 and ended on 19 November 2022. The Copa Verde final was played between Vila Nova and Paysandu.

Paysandu won the cup after defeating Vila Nova.

State championship champions

State championship second division champions

State cup competition champions

Youth competition champions

(1) The Copa Nacional do Espírito Santo Sub-17, between 2008 and 2012, was named Copa Brasil Sub-17. The similar named Copa do Brasil Sub-17 is organized by the Brazilian Football Confederation and it was first played in 2013.

Brazilian clubs in international competitions

National team
The following table lists all the games played by the Brazilian national team in official competitions and friendly matches during 2022.

Friendlies

FIFA World Cup qualification

FIFA World Cup

Women's football

Campeonato Brasileiro de Futebol Feminino Série A1

The 2022 Campeonato Brasileiro de Futebol Feminino Série A1 started on 4 March 2022 and ended on 24 September 2022.

Atlético Mineiro
Avaí
Corinthians
CRESSPOM
Cruzeiro
ESMAC
Ferroviária
Flamengo/Marinha
Grêmio
Internacional
Palmeiras
Real Brasília
Red Bull Bragantino
Santos
São José
São Paulo

The Campeonato Brasileiro de Futebol Feminino Série A1 final was played between Corinthians and Internacional.

Corinthians won the league after defeating Internacional.

Relegation
The four worst placed teams, CRESSPOM, Red Bull Bragantino, São José and ESMAC, were relegated to the following year's second level.

Campeonato Brasileiro de Futebol Feminino Série A2

The 2022 Campeonato Brasileiro de Futebol Feminino Série A2 started on 11 June 2022 and ended on 17 September 2022.

Aliança/Goiás
América Mineiro
Athletico Paranaense
Bahia
Botafogo
Botafogo (PB)
Ceará
CEFAMA
Fluminense
Fortaleza
Iranduba
JC
Minas/ICESP
Real Ariquemes
UDA
Vasco da Gama

The Campeonato Brasileiro de Futebol Feminino Série A2 final was played between Athletico Paranaense and Ceará.

Ceará won the league after defeating Athletico Paranaense.

Promotion
The four best placed teams, Bahia, Ceará, Athletico Paranaense and Real Ariquemes, were promoted to the following year's first level.

Relegation
The four worst placed teams, Vasco da Gama, Iranduba, CEFAMA and Aliança/Goiás, were relegated to the following year's third level.

Campeonato Brasileiro de Futebol Feminino Série A3

The 2022 Campeonato Brasileiro de Futebol Feminino Série A3 started on 11 June 2022 and ended on 28 August 2022.

3B da Amazônia
Abelhas Rainhas
Atlético Goianiense
Barcelona
Cabofriense
Coritiba/Imperial
CRB
Criciúma
Cuiabá
Doce Mel
Estanciano
Flamengo de São Pedro
Ipatinga
Juventude
Legião
Menina Olímpica
Mixto
Náutico
Operário
Paraíso
Realidade Jovem
Remo
Rio Branco (AC)
São Raimundo (RR)
Sport
AD Taubaté
Toledo
União/ABC
VF4
Vila Nova/UNIVERSO
Vila Nova (ES)
Ypiranga (AP)

The Campeonato Brasileiro de Futebol Feminino Série A3 final was played between AD Taubaté and 3B da Amazônia.

AD Taubaté won the league after defeating 3B da Amazônia.

Promotion
The four best placed teams, Sport, 3B da Amazônia, AD Taubaté and Vila Nova/UNIVERSO, were promoted to the following year's second level.

Super cup

Supercopa do Brasil de Futebol Feminino

The competition featured 8 clubs chosen between the top-twelve 2021 Série A1 and the top-four 2021 Série A2, with only one team for state. It started on 4 February 2022 and ended on 13 February 2022. The Supercopa do Brasil de Futebol Feminino final was played between Grêmio and Corinthians.

Corinthians won the super cup after defeating Grêmio.

Domestic competition champions

State cup competition champions

Youth competition champions

Brazilian clubs in international competitions

National team
The following table lists all the games played by the Brazil women's national football team in official competitions and friendly matches during 2022.

The Brazil women's national football team competed in the following competitions in 2022:

Friendlies

2022 Tournoi de France

2022 Copa América Femenina

References

External links
 Brazilian competitions at RSSSF

 
Seasons in Brazilian football